The action of 22 August 1795 was a minor naval engagement during the French Revolutionary Wars between a squadron of four British Royal Navy frigates and two frigates and a cutter from the Batavian Navy. The engagement was fought off the Norwegian coastal island of Eigerøya, then in Danish Norway, the opposing forces engaged in protecting their respective countries' trade routes to the Baltic Sea. War between Britain and the Batavian Republic began, undeclared, in the spring of 1795 after the Admiralty ordered British warships to intercept Batavian shipping following the conquest of the Dutch Republic by the French Republic in January 1795.

A British squadron of four frigates under the command of Captain James Alms was patrolling the entrance to the Skagerrak in August 1795 when three sails were spotted off the Norwegian coast to the north. Closing to investigate, the ships were discovered to be a Batavian squadron of two frigates and a small cutter. In the face of the larger British squadron the Batavian force turned away, sailing southeast along the Norwegian coast with the British approaching from the south in an effort to cut them off from the neutral Danish shore. At 16:15 the leading British ship HMS Stag caught and engaged the rearmost Batavian ship Alliantie (cdr. Claas Jager); the remainder of the British squadron continued in pursuit of the Batavian squadron. For an hour Alliantie traded broadsides with the more powerful Stag and was eventually compelled to surrender. The remainder of the Batavian squadron escaped due to a fierce rearguard action by the frigate Argo, reaching the safety of the Danish harbour at Eigerøya.

Background
In the winter of 1794–1795 the armies of the French Republic overran the Dutch Republic, reforming the country into a client state named the Batavian Republic. The Dutch Republic was part of the Coalition against Republican France formed in the War of the First Coalition at the start of the French Revolutionary Wars, and their closest ally in Northern Europe was Great Britain. In Britain the Admiralty was alarmed by developments in the Netherlands, particularly the seizure of the Dutch Navy by French cavalry units while the fleet was frozen into its winter harbour, and gave orders that the Royal Navy was to detain Dutch merchant and naval ships. As a result, the Batavian Republic and Great Britain began an undeclared war in the spring of 1795.

In response to the threat that the Batavian fleet posed, the Admiralty established a new British fleet to oppose it. The Admiralty named this force, under the command of Admiral Adam Duncan, the North Sea Fleet. The fleet was based at Yarmouth in East Anglia and consisted mainly of older and weaker second-line vessels. Duncan was also provided with a number of frigates, essential in securing the safe movement of the Baltic trade. Much of Britain's vital naval stores were obtained from Scandinavia and the trade routes through the Baltic Sea and North Sea were vital to the maintenance of the Royal Navy. One Navy squadron that sailed from The Downs on 8 August 1795 with instructions to cruise off the mouth of the Skaggerak in the Eastern North Sea, consisted of four ships: 36-gun HMS Reunion under Captain James Alms, 32-gun HMS Stag under Captain Joseph Sydney Yorke, 50-gun HMS Isis under Captain Robert Watson and 28-gun HMS Vestal under Captain Charles White.

The Scandinavian trade routes were equally important for the Batavian Navy, and to protect their merchant shipping from attack by British frigates, the Batavian authorities also sent a frigate squadron to the region, consisting of the 36-gun frigates Alliantie and Argo and the 16-gun cutter Vlugheid. On the afternoon of 22 August 1795 the Batavian force was sailing southeast along the coast of Norway, then part of Danish Norway, tacking to port towards the land, when the British squadron was spotted approaching from the south.

Battle

With their ships heavily outnumbered by the approaching British, the Batavian squadron made all sail along the coastline with the intention of sheltering in the neutral Danish harbour of Eigerøya (referred to in British sources as Egeroe or Egerö). Sighting the Batavian ships to the north, Alms ordered his squadron to give chase. Soon the fastest British ship, Stag made use of favourable wind to pull ahead of the others and at 16:15 succeeded in cutting off the rearmost Batavian vessel Alliantie from its companions. Although Alliantie with its 36-guns was a stronger ship than the 32-gun Stag, its main battery was of only 12-pounder cannon compared to Yorke's 18-pounder guns. This, coupled with the presence nearby of the rest of the British squadron meant that Alliantie, in the words of naval historian William James, "from the first, had no chance of success."

Despite the odds against him, the Batavian captain engaged Stag, Yorke laying his ship alongside Alliantie and the frigates exchanging broadsides for an hour before the Batavian captain, his situation hopeless and his ship outnumbered and battered, surrendered at 17:15. While Stag and Alliantie fought their duel, the action continued elsewhere, with the remaining Batavian ships making progress eastwards along the Norwegian coastline with the British squadron attempting to cut them off from the channel between Eigerøya and the Norwegian mainland in which the Batavian ships could shelter, protected by Danish neutrality. Vlugheid rapidly outdistanced pursuit, but Argo was slower and came under heavy but distant fire from Reunion and Isis, replying in kind. Argo was subsequently found to have been hit thirty times by 24-pounder shot and had much of its sails and rigging torn away, requiring extensive repairs. Eventually the Batavian persistence paid off, and Vlugheid and Argo successfully escaped into the neutral harbour of Eigerøya before Alms could intercept them.

Aftermath
Alms sent the captured Alliantie back to Britain under the command of Lieutenant Patrick Tonyn of Stag and gave despatches to the Admiralty to Lieutenant William Huggell of Reunion to deliver. He himself remained at sea with the squadron, completing their assigned patrol. British casualties included four killed and 13 wounded on Stag, one killed and three wounded on Reunion and two wounded on Isis. Only Vestal escaped without any damage or casualties. Batavian casualties in the engagement are not known due to the failure of Alms to record Alliantie's losses in his report to the Admiralty, an omission which James criticises him for. It is known that Argo lost two men killed and 15 wounded in the chase. The surviving Batavian ships remained at anchor in the Eigerøya channel until the spring of 1796 when they successfully returned to the Netherlands.

Alliantie was subsequently taken to Spithead and purchased for the Royal Navy as the frigate HMS Alliance, for which prize money was distributed to the crews of the British ships, shared equally among them. The sailors on Isis alone shared £240 (the equivalent of £ as of ). Over the ensuing months and years, Duncan's fleet was largely successful in protecting the North Sea trade routes from the depredations of raiders from the Batavian ports and in 1797 inflicted a crushing defeat on the Batavian fleet at the Battle of Camperdown.

Meanwhile, the reaction in the Batavian Republic was one of indignation. In a resolution made on 3 September 1795 the Provisionele Representanten van het Volk van Holland, the Dutch representative at the Danish Court, Christiaan Huygens, was ordered to complain about the supposed violation of Danish neutrality (as according to the Dutch, Norwegian and Danish pilots had already gone aboard the Dutch ships, indicating that said ships had entered Danish territorial waters) and to demand that Denmark would make representations at the Court of St. James's to obtain the return of the Alliantie. The new commander-in-chief of the Batavian navy, Admiral Jan de Winter issued a proclamation which praised the conduct of the Dutch vessels (confirming that the Argo, under command of Cdr. Van Dirckinck, had lost two killed and fifteen injured). In this proclamation he also suggests that the Batavian brigs Echo, Gier and Mercuur in reprisal had stopped four British merchantmen and brought them into Kristiansand. A letter of representative Bangeman Huygens written on 19 September 1795 to the Provisionele Representanten reports that the Danish government indeed made diplomatic overtures to the British government (evidently without result) and that the sailors of the British prize ships in the port of Kristiansand had been delivered to the British Consul "John Mischell" [sic] on 22 August 1795. On the other hand, letters from two Dutch officers (Bakker and Gras) of the Alliantie to the Board of Admiralty of the Royal Navy showed that the officers and men of the captured frigate were prisoners of war in Ashford, Kent in early 1796 as the two nations were now officially at war.

Notes

References
 
 
 
 
 
 

Naval battles of the French Revolutionary Wars
Conflicts in 1795
Naval battles involving the Batavian Republic
Naval battles involving Great Britain
Battles of the War of the First Coalition
Military history of the North Sea
History of Rogaland